Merle Nelson (née Royte) (born May 8, 1935) is an American politician and court mediator.

Early life and education
Nelson, who is Jewish, was born and raised in Portland, Maine. She graduated from Deering High School in 1953. She earned a teaching degree from Lesley College in Cambridge, Massachusetts. She began teaching and earned a M.A. from Harvard University.

Political career
A Democrat, she served five terms in the Maine House of Representatives from 1977 to 1986. In 1977, while a first-term legislator, Nelson testified to the Subcommittee on Employment, Poverty, and Migratory Labor of the United States Congresss on behalf of the Displaced Homemakers Act. Nelson played a leading role in helping establish Seeds of Peace international summer camp in Otisfield, Maine. In 2005, Governor John Baldacci nominated her to the board of trustees of the Maine Community College System. The Maine Centers for Women, Work, and Community's Merle Nelson Making a Difference award is named in her honor.

Family
She is married to a fellow Harvard alumnus Leonard Nelson, a Portland-based corporate attorney. They live in Falmouth Foreside, Maine. One of their children, Judd Nelson (born 1959), is a well-known television and film actor.

References

1935 births
Living people
Deering High School alumni
Lesley University alumni
Harvard University alumni
Politicians from Portland, Maine
People from Falmouth, Maine
Women state legislators in Maine
Jewish American state legislators in Maine
Democratic Party members of the Maine House of Representatives
Jewish women politicians
Seeds of Peace
21st-century American Jews
21st-century American women